was a city located in eastern Shizuoka Prefecture. On November 1, 1966, Yoshiwara was merged with the city of Fuji.

During the Edo period, Yoshiwara was a post town known as Yoshiwara-juku on the Tōkaidō (road). At the time of its merger, the town had an estimated population of 90,224 and a density of 516.86 persons per km2. The total area was 174.56 km2. The town was served by both the Tōkaidō Main Line and the Gakunan Railway.

History
April 1, 1889 –  Due to the municipal status enforcement, Yoshiwara-juku, Fuji District becomes Yoshiwara Town.
April 1, 1940 –  The village of Shimada (島田村) merged into the city of Yoshiwara
April 3, 1941 –  The village of Denbō (伝法村) merged into the city of Yoshiwara
June 14, 1942 –  Imaizumi Village (今泉村) merged into Yoshiwara.
April 1, 1948 – The town of Yoshiwara becomes the city of Yoshiwara.
February 11, 1955 – The city merged with the villages of Motoyoshiwara (元吉原村), Sudo (須津村), Yoshinaga (吉永村), and Harada (原田村) to form the city of Yoshiwara.
April 1, 1955 –  Ōbuchi Village (大淵村) merged into the city of Yoshiwara.
April 1, 1956 –  Funazu, Nishifunazu, and Sakai neighborhoods in the village of Hara in Suntō District merge into the city of Yoshiwara.
November 1, 1966 – The city merged with the city of Fuji and the town of Takaoka (鷹岡町) to form the city of Fuji.

See also
List of dissolved municipalities of Japan

Notes

Yoshiwara
Fuji, Shizuoka